This list comprises the entire Beatmania, Beatmania IIDX and Beatmania III catalog of music video games. This list does not contain beta, demo, bootlegged, or unreleased games.

This list is incomplete. If you know of a release that is not listed please add it.

Legend

These lists are sorted by region of release, then platform, then best-known release date.

Beatmania

Beatmania IIDX

Beatmania III

See also
List of Dance Dance Revolution games
List of GuitarFreaks & DrumMania games

References

External links
DDRUK Song Lists Beatmania
DDRUK Song Lists Beatmania IIDX
DDRUK Song Lists Bemani Pocket
bemanistyle Beatmania Game Info
bemanistyle Beatmania IIDX Game Info
bemanistyle Beatmania III Game Info
List of beat mania pocket series

 
Beatmania games